Area codes 860 and 959 are telephone area codes in the North American Numbering Plan in the U.S. state of Connecticut. They are arranged in an overlay plan that covers most of the state, except its southwest, which uses area codes 203 and 475.

Area code 860 was created on August 28, 1995, as a numbering plan area split from area code 203, in which the latter was reduced to Fairfield County (except for Sherman) and New Haven County, plus part of Litchfield County (Bethlehem, Woodbury, and a small part of Roxbury). Dialing of area code 860 became mandatory on October 4, 1996.

Area code 959 was originally announced in August 1999 to overlay area code 860, but implementation efforts were delayed for over a decade, culminating in an effective starting date for operation of August 30, 2014.  Nevertheless, all calls within Connecticut required ten-digit dialing as of November 14, 2009.

1999 overlay proposal
In August 1999, the Connecticut Department of Public Utility Control proposed an area code overlay for numbering plan area 860, adding the new area code 959. This proposal was postponed for nearly a decade due to number conservation measures; in September 2008, the overlay was scheduled within two years (as of August 30, 2011, an activation date for 959 had not been announced). In March 2009, it was announced that the 203/475 overlay would be activated on December 12, 2009, with the 860/959 overlay becoming active by 2011. 

Even though the 959 area code did not have a specific start date, all callers in Connecticut were required to dial ten digits, including the area code. A leading 1 is required for originating toll calls from landlines, effective November 14, 2009, to reach another Connecticut number, including calls involving two numbers with the same area code.

On August 27, 2013, the NANPA issued Planning Letter 456 which states that the 959 area code would go into effect on August 30, 2014. The first 959 area code numbers were distributed in December 2015.

Major cities and towns

Bloomfield
Bristol
East Hartford
East Lyme
Enfield
Glastonbury
Groton
Hartford
Litchfield
Manchester
Middletown
New Britain
New London
New Milford
Norwich
Old Lyme
Sherman
Southington
Storrs
Stonington
Torrington
West Hartford
Willimantic
Windsor

References

External links

List of exchanges from AreaCodeDownload.com, 860 Area Code
Regulators Have Area Code Plan—1999 news story on planned overlay

Telecommunications-related introductions in 1995
860
860
Hartford County, Connecticut
Litchfield County, Connecticut
Middlesex County, Connecticut
New Haven County, Connecticut
New London County, Connecticut
Tolland County, Connecticut
Windham County, Connecticut